Microchrysa cyaneiventris, the black gem, is a European species of soldier fly.

Description
A small species (Body 4.0 mm. long) Antennae yellow. Legs predominantly yellow. Pubescence in middle part of mesonotum  and on abdomen light-colored in male. Abdomen of female and also frons of female shiny black, at most with a light bluish tinge.

Biology
The flight period is  May to September. Habitats are deciduous woodland edges, hedgerows, isolated trees, and bushes. It is associated with water margins and fallen decomposing leaves. Larvae have been found in decaying vegetation and moss.

Distribution
North Europe. Central Europe.

References

Stratiomyidae
Diptera of Europe
Insects described in 1842
Taxa named by Johan Wilhelm Zetterstedt